The East Forest Avenue Historic District is located in Neenah, Wisconsin, USA. It was added to the State and the National Register of Historic Places in 2005. The Charles R. Smith House and the Henry Spencer Smith House are located in the district.

References

Historic districts on the National Register of Historic Places in Wisconsin
National Register of Historic Places in Winnebago County, Wisconsin